Nitaskinan is the ancestral homeland of the Atikamekw people.  It is located in the valley of the Saint-Maurice River in Quebec, Canada. It covers an area of 80,000 km2 (30,000 sq. mi.) On 8 September 2014, the Conseil de la Nation Atikamekw declared unilaterally the sovereignty of the Atikamekw Nation on the Nistaskinan. The objective of this is mainly to obtain a right of review for the projects exploiting the natural resources and to highlight the Atikamekw's identity. "Nitaskinan" means "our (excl.) land" in the Atikamekw language, where "Kitaskinan" means "our (inclusive) land," similar to other Cree languages' use of aski. From a legal perspective, according to the Indian Act, the Atikamekw have self-administration on three Indian reserves, Manawan, Obedjiwan and Wemotaci, but the Nitaskinan territory covers an area much wider.

See also
Conseil de la Nation Atikamekw

References

Atikamekw
Geography of Quebec
First Nations history in Quebec
Indigenous politics in Canada
Cultural regions